Arizona Bound is a 1941 American Western film directed by Spencer Gordon Bennet. This is the first film in Monogram Pictures' Rough Riders series, and stars Buck Jones as Marshal Buck Roberts, Tim McCoy as Marshal Tim McCall and Raymond Hatton as Marshal Sandy Hopkins, with Luana Walters, Dennis Moore and Kathryn Sheldon.

Plot summary 

Father killed, fiance wounded, gold stolen, Ruth Masters is distraught over what's been happening to her Arizona stagecoach line and considers leaving the business for good. Saloon owner Steve Taggert is pleased, hoping to increase his holdings in Mesa City with her gone.

A retired marshal, Buck Roberts, rides into town, selling cattle. In the saloon he and the others encounter Colonel Tim McCall, a preacher who objects to Sunday sales of whiskey. Buck offers to assist Ruth by driving the stage carrying the next gold shipment, with her recovering sweetheart Joe going along to keep an eye on things for her. A cattleman, Sandy Hopkins, also volunteers to help.

The stage is robbed by masked men. Gold is found in Buck's saddlebags, so he is arrested and some of the townspeople demand that he be hanged. Joe reveals that Buck, anticipating the holdup, hid the gold safely while the robbers got away with nothing but worthless rocks. Buck, Tim and Sandy all turn out to be ex-lawmen, now working undercover to expose the criminals in town. They ride off their separate ways, their work here done.

Cast 
 Buck Jones as Marshal Buck Roberts
 Tim McCoy as Marshal Tim McCall / "Parson" McCall
 Raymond Hatton as Marshal Sandy Hopkins
 Luana Walters as Ruth Masters
 Dennis Moore as Joe Brooke
 Kathryn Sheldon as Aunt Miranda Masters
 Tristram Coffin as Steve Taggert
 Horace Murphy as Bunion (Buck's Ranch Hand)

Soundtrack 
 Male chorus - "The Rough Riders Theme" (Written by Edward J. Kay)
 Cowhands - "Home on the Range"
 Saloon Barflies and Henchmen - "Bury Me Not on the Lone Prairie"
 Saloon's piano player - "Oh, Susanna"

See also

The Rough Riders series:
 The Gunman from Bodie
 Forbidden Trails
 Below the Border
 Ghost Town Law
 Down Texas Way
 Riders of the West
 West of the Law

External links 
 
 

1941 films
1941 Western (genre) films
American Western (genre) films
American black-and-white films
1940s English-language films
Monogram Pictures films
Films directed by Spencer Gordon Bennet
1940s American films